The Defamation of Strickland Banks is the second studio album from English singer and rapper Plan B. It was released on 12 April 2010 by 679 Recordings. The album is a departure from the sound heard on Plan B's debut album Who Needs Actions When You Got Words, providing a showcase for the rapper's singing. Lyrically the album's songs tell the fictitious tale of one Strickland Banks, a sharp-suited British soul singer who finds fame with bitter-sweet love songs like the album's opener "Love Goes Down", only to have it slip through his fingers when sent to prison for a crime he did not commit.

The album received generally positive reviews from music critics. It produced the singles "Stay Too Long", "She Said", "Prayin', "The Recluse", "Love Goes Down", "Writing's on the Wall" and "Hard Times". The album has sold 1.4 million copies in the UK as of May 2018.

Background 
Drew had always wanted to make his second album as a concept album and he had previously abandoned an attempt to make a hip hop follow up to his debut Who Needs Actions When You Got Words. After learning more about the technical aspects of singing and having written some soul songs such as "Love Goes Down", which was written whilst supporting The Roots on tour in 2006, Plan B came up with the concept of a story about a soul singer who gets sent to prison. He commenced recording of the album in which half the songs were hip hop tracks narrated by Plan B and the other half were soul songs told through the eyes of the fictional character Strickland Banks. However, this idea was scrapped because the two genres did not work well together and the label 679 Artists thought the idea was too confusing. Hence the album was split into two records and it was agreed that the soul record would be released as Plan B's second studio album. The sound of the album was influenced by Paul Epworth who produced the demo version of "Writing's on the Wall", although the majority of the album was recorded with producers David McEwan and Eric Appapoulay at The Sanctuary, London. Production took more than two years due to the simultaneous work on the hip hop and soul albums.

Concept 
The album tells the story from the first-hand perspective of Strickland Banks, a fictional character played by Plan B.

The album's opening track, "Love Goes Down" is a love song sang by Banks about his girlfriend while "Writing's on the Wall" details the new difficulties in their relationship. "Stay Too Long" follows him and his entourage as they celebrate the success of his concert with a night out which culminates in him having a one-night stand with a woman. In "She Said", it is learned that this woman is obsessed with his music and believes herself to be in love with him. He rejects her so she alleges that he raped her and the subsequent trial results in his incarceration

In "Welcome to Hell" he is sent to prison, and much of the rest of the album is about his experience inside. Throughout the course of the songs "Hard Times" and "The Recluse", Strickland gets more isolated and insecure throughout as he struggles to cope with prison life. This results in his abuse at the hands of other prisoners, resulting in him purchasing a shiv on the prison black market throughout the course of "Traded in My Cigarettes". In "Prayin'" he is confronted by another prisoner who attacks him. With the help of another inmate Strickland kills the attacker in self-defence, with the other inmate taking the blame, and is burdened with this guilt during "Darkest Place".

The next two tracks, "Free" and "I Know a Song" detail initially his anger, then his acceptance of his life inside prison. In the last track, "What You Gonna Do", Strickland is in court again as new evidence has been brought up on his case while he waits anxiously to hear the verdict. The album finishes with the listener not sure of whether he is sent back to prison or released, leaving it open to interpretation.

Singles 
"Stay Too Long" was released as the first single from the album on 8 January 2010. It entered the UK Singles Chart on 17 January 2010, where it reached a peak of No. 9. It also peaked at No. 3 on the UK R&B Chart, making it Drew's first Top 10 single.

"She Said" was released as the second single from the album, on 24 February 2010. It reached No. 3 on the UK Singles Chart on 4 April 2010 as well as peaking at No. 1 on the UK R&B Chart, making it Drew's biggest selling single to date.

"Prayin' was released as the third single from the album, on 9 July 2010. It climbed up the chart. before peaking at No. 16 on the UK Singles Chart. It also peaked at No. 9 on the UK R&B Chart, and overall, is Drew's second biggest single.

"The Recluse" was released as the fourth single from the album on 4 October 2010. The single peaked at No. 35 on the UK Singles Chart, and at No. 19 on the UK R&B Chart, making it Drew's fourth consecutive Top 40 hit, and fifth overall.

"Love Goes Down" was released as the fifth single from the album on 3 December 2010. It was later added to the A-List BBC Radio 1 Playlist, and peaked at No. 62 on the UK Singles Chart. "She Said" / "Prayin" was released a digital download medley single on 20 February 2011 after Drew performed the medley at the 2011 BRIT Awards. It charted at No. 72 on the UK Singles Chart. The medley also includes an excerpt of The Ballad of Belmarsh.

"Writing's on the Wall" was released as the sixth single from the album on 7 March 2011. The single did not chart on the UK Singles Chart. Two versions of the music video were released; the first available in February 2010.

"Hard Times" was released as the album's seventh and final single on 19 May 2011. The single version features newly recorded vocals from Elton John and Paloma Faith and peaked at No. 147 on the UK Singles Chart, in aid of Drew's chosen charity.

Film 
The Defamation of Strickland Banks is intended to be made into a musical film directed by Plan B himself. It was originally conceived as a short film to be released alongside the album and the original trailer was uploaded online in late 2009. The film intends to incorporate all the music videos from The Defamation of Strickland Banks and The Ballad of Belmarsh with scenes of dialogue. Kelly Brook and Roger Daltrey have also been rumoured to have roles in the film. A second film trailer was uploaded to YouTube in February 2011.

Critical reception 

Upon its release, The Defamation of Strickland Banks received generally positive reviews from music critics. At Metacritic, which assigns a normalised rating out of 100 to reviews from mainstream critics, the album received an average score of 75, based on 16 reviews, which indicates "generally favorable reviews". The critics tended to compare this work with Plan B's previous album, Who Needs Actions When You Got Words, from four years earlier. The change from "spectacularly violent soliloquies" on his debut to crooning soul on his second effort caught some reviewers by surprise, though not all unhappily. Ian Wade of the BBC gave the album and Plan B great praise, calling it "tremendous work", admiring its range, as for example "on 'Welcome to Hell' he trills like a scared-to-pick-up-the-soap-in-the-prison-shower Smokey Robinson, while 'Hard Times' and 'Love Goes Down' are just lovely – anyone operating in the greasy world of pop would give a limb for such songs." For Pete Paphides of The Times, Defamation deserved 4 out of 5 stars.

The Guardians Alexis Petridis gave it 3 out of 5 stars. Though dissatisfied with its concept and "gaping holes in the album's plot", he said, "Drew's reinvention suits him. The strength of his voice was understandably overlooked on his debut, but it comes into its own here: a high, aching croon that adds an appealing touch of self-doubt to the hardest-hitting lyrics. Rather than simply drafting in Mark Ronson to add a retro-soul veneer, he's clearly studied the source material: the result is a string of uniformly well-done Smokey Robinson pastiches. In a neat touch, the bleaker Strickland Banks's story becomes, the lovelier the melodies.". John Freeman, writing for Clash, gave it a 7/10 rating, while suggesting that the style change. NMEs Sam Wolfson gave the album a rating of 6 out of 10, and expressed regret at Plan B's move into new territory. At The Telegraph, Thomas H Green gave it 4 out of 5 stars, calling it "accessible, polished and brimming with verve". He closed his review saying, "The rapping hasn't been completely abandoned, either, but the emphasis here is on his sweet soul voice and a thumping Motown groove, an intriguing change of direction that's both passionate and populist."

Commercial performance 
On 18 April 2010, the album debuted on the UK Albums Chart at No. 1, selling 68,173 copies in its first week and a further 47,950 in its second week. It was the 5th biggest selling album of 2010 in the United Kingdom, with sales of 826,400. As of May 2018, the album has sold 1.4 million copies in the UK.

Track listing 

Note
 The deluxe edition sold at HMV does not contain the Shy FX remix of "She Said".

Personnel 
 Ben Drew – vocals, producer, mixing

Production

 David McEwan – producer, engineer, mixing
 Paul Epworth – producer, mixing
 Eric Appapoulay – additional producer, mixing
 Mark "Top" Rankin – engineer, mixing
 Will Kennard – additional mixing
 Harry Escott – string arrangements
 Sally Herbert – string arrangements
 Jason Yarde – brass arrangements
 Guy Davie – mastering

Additional musicians
 Aleysha Gordon – backing vocals
 Hannah Kemoh – backing vocals
 Samantha Smith – backing vocals
 Jennifer Dawodu  – backing vocals
 Marvin Cottrell  – backing vocals
 Tom Wright-Goss – guitar
 Eric Appapoulay – bass, backing vocals
 Jodi Milliner – bass
 Darren Playford - drums. co-writer
 Cassell The BeatMaker – drums. co-writer
 Paul Epworth – drums
 Everton Newson – violin
 Louisa Fuller – violin
 Sally Herbert – violin
 Warren Zielinski – violin
 Bruce White – viola
 Sonia Slany – viola
 Ian Burdge – cello
 Harry Escott – additional cello
 Jason Yarde – alto saxophone, baritone saxophone
 Zem Audu – tenor saxophone
 Harry Brown – trombone
 David Prisemen – trumpet, flugelhorn
 Mark Crown – trumpet

Managerial and design
 Fabrice Spelta – art direction
 Mike Hosey – art direction
 Ben Parks – photography
 Roy Eldridge – management
 Sam Eldridge – management

Charts and certifications

Weekly charts

Year-end charts

Decade-end charts

Certifications

Release history

See also 
 The Defamation of Strickland Banks Tour

References

External links 
 
 
 
 The Defamation of Strickland Banks at Metacritic

2010 albums
679 Artists albums
Albums produced by Paul Epworth
Atlantic Records albums
Concept albums
Soul albums by English artists
Plan B (musician) albums